is a Japanese geographical term.  It means both an ancient division of the country and the main road running through it.  Saikaido was one of the main circuits of the Gokishichidō system, which was originally established during the Asuka period.

This name identified the geographic region of Kyūshū and the islands of Tsushima and Iki. It consisted of nine ancient provinces and two islands.  The provinces included Chikuzen, Chikugo, Buzen, Bungo, Hizen, Higo, Hyūga, Satsuma and Ōsumi.

See also
 Comparison of past and present administrative divisions of Japan

Notes

References
 Nussbaum, Louis-Frédéric and Käthe Roth. (2005).  Japan encyclopedia. Cambridge: Harvard University Press. ;  OCLC 58053128

Road transport in Japan
Saikaido